Sister Sin is a Swedish heavy metal band.

Sister Sin may also refer to:

Sin (Marvel Comics), a comic book character also known as Sister Sin
"Sister Sin", a song by Nickelback from the album No Fixed Address, 2014